Mary O’Leary is a former camogie player, winner of the B+I Star of the Year award in 1982 and All Ireland medals in 1978, 1980, 1982 (when her last-gasp point secured victory for Cork) and 1983.

Family
She is a sister of Cork hurler Seánie O'Leary, a four times All Ireland medalist.

Free taker
As well as her 1982 All Ireland winning point she also pointed a long range free at the end of the 1982 Gael Linn Cup final to win the cup for Munster.

Awards
She was the second winner of the Cospoir/Glen Abbey Hosiery women in sport award in 1982.

References

Living people
Cork camogie players
Year of birth missing (living people)